Adam Fastnacht (27 July 1913, in Sanok – 16 February 1987, in Wrocław)
doctor hab., historian, editor. He was a Polish historian, researcher of the history of the town and the district of Sanok Land. Fastnacht was born to a German family who settled in the east. He studied in Sanok, in Lwów at Lviv University under Franciszek Bujak and at the Jagiellonian University in Kraków, where in 1946 he received his PhD. Fastnacht was a member of the Armia Krajowa.

He was long-standing curator of the Ossolineum .

Bibliography
 Adam Fastnacht, Slownik Historyczno-Geograficzny Ziemi Sanockiej w Średniowieczu (Historic-Geographic Dictionary of the Sanok District in the Middle Ages), Kraków, (II edition 2002), .
 Osadnictwo Ziemi Sanockiej w latach 1340-1650, Wrocław 1962
 Zarys dziejów Sanoka. W: Księga pamiątkowa Gimnazjum Męskiego w Sanoku 1888-1958, Kraków 1958
 Dzieje Leska do 1772 roku, Rzeszów 1988
 Sanok. Materiały do dziejów miasta do XVII wieku, Opracował prof. Feliks Kiryk, Brzozów, 1990

References 

20th-century Polish historians
Polish male non-fiction writers
1913 births
1987 deaths
Jagiellonian University alumni
Polish people of German descent
Historians of Poland
People from Sanok